David Williams (8 September 1865 – 22 January 1941) was a Welsh Labour Party politician.
The second son of David and Mary Williams, his father worked at the local Kilvey Copper Works. Williams received little education before entering service in 1877 as a pageboy for the Genfell family of Kilvey, Swansea, owners of the copper works. By the age of 16, he was working in the copper works, but was dismissed after leading a strike. He then became an apprentice boilermaker, while attending evening classes. In 1889, he married Elizabeth Colwill, and the couple had five children.

Williams was involved in trade union activities and Labour politics from a young age. In 1898, he became the first Independent Labour Party councillor elected to Swansea Town Council, becoming an alderman in 1904 and was mayor of Swansea in 1912–1913. He received the freedom of Swansea in 1924. He was the first chairman of the Swansea Co-operative Society when it was formed in 1900.

He unsuccessfully contested the parliamentary constituency of Swansea East at the 1918 general election. When the Coalition Liberal MP Thomas Jeremiah Williams died the following year, he stood in the resulting by-election, cutting the Liberal majority. He won the seat at the 1922 general election, and held it until he resigned from the House of Commons on 26 January 1940, due to ill health. He died a year later, aged 75.

References

External links 
 

1865 births
1941 deaths
Welsh Labour Party MPs
Members of the Parliament of the United Kingdom for Swansea constituencies
Politicians from Swansea
UK MPs 1922–1923
UK MPs 1923–1924
UK MPs 1924–1929
UK MPs 1929–1931
UK MPs 1931–1935
UK MPs 1935–1945
British boilermakers
Mayors of Swansea
United Society of Boilermakers-sponsored MPs